David William Lightfoot (born February 10, 1945) is an American linguist who served as an assistant director of the National Science Foundation from 2005 to 2009. He is a professor of linguistics at Georgetown University.

Books
 The language lottery: toward a biology of grammars
  Born to Parse: How Children Select Their Languages 
  How to Set Parameters: Arguments From Language Change

References 

Linguists from the United States
Living people
Linguistic Society of America presidents
University of Michigan alumni
Georgetown University faculty
1945 births
Philosophers of linguistics
Deans of the Georgetown University Graduate School of Arts and Sciences
Fellows of the Linguistic Society of America